Cunninghame North (Gaelic: Coineagan a Tuath) is a constituency of the Scottish Parliament (Holyrood) covering part of the council area of North Ayrshire. It elects one Member of the Scottish Parliament (MSP) by the first past the post method of election. It is also one of ten constituencies in the West Scotland electoral region, which elects seven additional members, in addition to the ten constituency MSPs, to produce a form of proportional representation for the region as a whole.

First contested at the 1999 Scottish Parliament election, the seat was affected by minor boundary changes ahead of the 2011 Scottish Parliament election. It has been held by Kenneth Gibson of the Scottish National Party (SNP) since the 2007 Scottish Parliament election.

Electoral region 

The other nine constituencies of the West Scotland region are Clydebank and Milngavie, Cunninghame South, Dumbarton, Eastwood, Greenock and Inverclyde, Paisley, Renfrewshire North and West, Renfrewshire South and Strathkelvin and Bearsden.

The region covers part of the Argyll and Bute council area, the East Dunbartonshire council area, the East Renfrewshire council area, the Inverclyde council area, North Ayrshire council area, the Renfrewshire council area and the West Dunbartonshire council area.

Constituency boundaries and council area 

The constituency is one of two in North Ayrshire, with the rest of the council area being covered by the Cunninghame South constituency.

Cunninghame North was created at the same time as the Scottish Parliament, in 1999, with the name and boundaries of the existing constituency. In 2005, however, the Westminster (House of Commons) constituency was abolished in favour of new constituencies, causing Westminster and Holyrood constituency to no longer correspond.

Following their First Periodic review into constituencies to the Scottish Parliament in time for the 2011 Scottish Parliament election, the Boundary Commission for Scotland altered the boundaries of the constituency. The electoral wards used in the current creation of Cunninghame North are:

In full: 
Ardrossan and Arran
Dalry and West Kilbride
Kilbirnie and Beith
North Coast and Cumbraes
In part: (shared with Cunninghame South)
Stevenston
Saltcoats

Constituency profile and voting patterns

Constituency profile 
The Cunninghame North constituency covers a diverse mix of areas located towards the northern half of the North Ayrshire Council area, rising from the  working class towns of Ardrossan and Saltcoats in the south-west up to the  coastal towns of Fairlie, Skelmorlie, Largs and West Kilbride in the north-west. West of here, across the Firth of Clyde, sits the Island communities of Arran and Cumbrae, which are covered by the constituency. Along the east of the constituency is the more working-class Garnock Valley which comprises Kilbirnie, Beith and Dalry, towns which once specialised in the production of steel and textiles before the industries collapse across the 20th Century. The constituency is mostly working-class in nature, although this is contrasted by the affluence enjoyed in the more rural parts of the constituency and in areas such as Arran, Fairlie, Skelmorlie, West Kilbride and patches of Largs. The constituency returned a high unemployment rate of 6.4% at the 2011 census compared to the Scottish average of 4.8%.

Voting patterns 
Throughout the early 20th Century Cunninghame North was a safe Unionist seat at the British Parliament, carried by the Scottish Unionists (and later the Scottish Conservatives) consistently as Bute and Northern Ayrshire from 1918 until the constituency's abolishment in 1983, where the newly established Cunninghame North seat was narrowly won by Conservative John Corrie with a majority of 4.1%. In 1987 the constituency went Labour with a majority of 10.4%, with the Conservatives gradually losing ground in the constituency, eventually falling behind the Scottish National Party in 2001. Since then the Westminster seat of Cunninghame North, later North Ayrshire and Arran, had consistently returned Labour MP's to the British Parliament until being won by the SNP in 2015 on a swing of 23.3%. At the Scottish Parliament the Cunninghame North constituency voted Labour in both 1999 and 2003 before being won by the SNP's Kenneth Gibson by 48 votes in 2007, with some stipulating that had a set of damaged and rejected ballots from the Isle of Arran been counted the result might have been a Labour hold. In 2011 and 2016 Kenneth Gibson managed to build upon his narrow majority, bringing him ahead by 27.3% in 2016 - where the Conservatives marginally overtook the Labour Party into second place in the constituency for the first time since 1983.

The Conservative Party derive most of their support from the affluent resort towns of West Kilbride, Fairlie, Skelmorlie and Largs along the north-west coast of the constituency, as well as from the Isle of Arran, and rural and suburban areas in Garnock Valley. The SNP are strongest in the more populated parts of the constituency, in the towns of Ardrossan, Saltcoats and Kilbirnie, as well as parts of Largs, Dalry and the Isle of Cumbrae. Dalry, Kilbirnie, Ardrossan and Saltcoats are historically stronger areas for the Labour Party which have since voted SNP.

Members of the Scottish Parliament 
Kenneth Gibson of the Scottish National Party presently holds this seat. With a majority of just 48 over Labour incumbent Allan Wilson at the 2007 election, this was the most marginal seat in Holyrood. However, at the 2011 election, Gibson increased his majority over the Labour candidate to a much healthier 6,117 and this further increased in 2016 to 8,724, his biggest to date at that time. His majority fell in the 2021 election.

Election results

2020s

2010s

2000s
In the 2007 election, the high number of rejected votes was particularly significant in Cunninghame North as the majority (48) was far smaller than the number of rejected papers (over 1,000). Additionally, ballot papers carried by boat from the Isle of Arran were damp when they arrived, raising suggestions they may not have been transported securely. There were also questions about a discrepancy in the number of ballot papers that left Arran and the number that arrived at the count, though the returning officer later announced that a manual recount found no discrepancy.
Allan Wilson, the former member for Cunninghame North, was said to be discussing with his solicitor a potential legal challenge to the Cunninghame North result but no election petition was lodged.

1990s

Notes and references

External links

Politics of North Ayrshire
Constituencies of the Scottish Parliament
1999 establishments in Scotland
Constituencies established in 1999
Scottish Parliament constituencies and regions 1999–2011
Scottish Parliament constituencies and regions from 2011
Ardrossan−Saltcoats−Stevenston
Garnock Valley
Isle of Arran
Largs